Shinbone Ridge is a ridge in the U.S. states of Alabama and Georgia.

Shinbone Ridge was named after the shinbone in the skeletal system of the horse. This is a continuation of horse-themed natural feature names in the area; cf. Horseleg Mountain.

References

Landforms of Cherokee County, Alabama
Landforms of Etowah County, Alabama
Landforms of DeKalb County, Alabama
Landforms of Chattooga County, Georgia
Ridges of Alabama
Ridges of Georgia (U.S. state)